Just Say Noël is a Christmas compilation album on Geffen Records. It includes cover songs ("Santa Doesn't Cop Out On Dope" and "Millie Pulled a Pistol On Santa") as well as traditional Christmas songs (e.g. "Amazing Grace"). A new recording of "Christmas Is Quiet" by the Wild Colonials was released as a digital only single in late 2008.

Track listing
 "The Little Drum Machine Boy" – Beck
 "Christmastime" – Aimee Mann with Michael Penn
 "Santa Doesn't Cop Out On Dope" – Sonic Youth
 "Christmas" – The Posies
 "Millie Pulled A Pistol On Santa" – The Roots
 "Merry Christmas Baby" – Southern Culture on the Skids
 "Christmas" – Remy Zero
 "Gloria" – Elastica
 "Christmas Is Quiet" – Wild Colonials
 "Thanks For Christmas" – XTC
 "The Closing Of The Year" – The Musical Cast Of Toys featuring Wendy and Lisa
 "Amazing Grace" – Ted Hawkins

References

1996 Christmas albums
1996 compilation albums
Christmas compilation albums
Geffen Records compilation albums